Knox United Methodist Church is known to be the first Filipino United Methodist Church in the Philippines located along Rizal Avenue in Sta. Cruz, Manila.

History
The first Protestant worship service in the Philippines was held in Manila on August 28, 1898, officiated by Rev. George C. Stull, a Methodist chaplain and a member of the Montana Annual Conference. American and Filipino soldiers attended said service. In March 1899, Bishop James M. Thoburn visited Manila and organized a Methodist group into a charge affiliated with the Singapore District of the Malaysia Mission Conference.

Early years
Formerly known as the Knox Memorial Church, the church evolved into two worshiping congregations, the English congregation under Arthur Prautch and the Spanish congregation under Nicolas V. Zamora.

Knox UMC was also the first permanent Methodist structure built in the Philippines. The Philippine government donated large parcel of land at Calle Cervantes (Rizal Avenue) in Manila where a small chapel was built, known as the Cervantes Methodist Church. In 1906, a large permanent church structure was built under the supervision of Reverend M.A. Rader, the same site where Knox UMC presently stands. The church was first named as "First Methodist Church", and the original cornerstone bears its name. It was changed to Knox Memorial Methodist Church, named after Henry Knox who spearheaded the church construction and donated $15,000.

World War II
Knox remained a Filipino Church, not until the liberation of Manila in 1945 between the Allied and Japanese troops. The Central United Methodist Church was totally destroyed by the war and its congregation was transferred to Knox that formed the Knox-Central Church. During this time, the English service congregation grew rapidly. In 1949 Central UMC was re-established at its original site in T.M. Kalaw Street, Manila.

Another milestone
The second half of the 20th century marked as striking increase in Knox UMC's membership. Thus, this required a bigger space for worship. In 1948, plans were made for its reconstruction and the main sanctuary was completed first in 1953. Reconstruction underwent several phases because new facilities were added (especially for Sunday School), which was completed in 1964.

Services and other activities

 Ilocano Service
 Tagalog Service

 English Service
 Aldersgate Service

 Vesper Service
 Midweek Service

 Youth Service
 Children's Worship

 Sunday School
 Bible Study

See also
 The United Methodist Church
 Philippines Central Conference (United Methodist Church)
 Central United Methodist Church (Manila)

External links
Official site of Knox United Methodist Church
Pinoy Metodista - United Methodist Church in the Philippines
Official website of The UMC - Manila Episcopal Area
Official website of The UMC - Baguio Episcopal Area
The Story of Methodism in the Philippines
Official site of Central United Methodist Church

References
"History of Knox UMC: 1898-2005." Knox United Methodist Church, 2005. https://web.archive.org/web/20080607181801/http://www.knoxumc.com/history.htm (Accessed on September 11, 2007).

United Methodist Church
Churches in Manila
Buildings and structures in Santa Cruz, Manila
Cultural Properties of the Philippines in Metro Manila
Methodism in Asia